Kaminieli Tako Aria (1921–1967) was a Fijian cricketer.

Aria made his first-class debut for Fiji in 1948 against Auckland during Fiji's tour of New Zealand. During the tour he played two further first-class matches against Otago and Auckland. In his three first-class matches for Fiji he scored 114 runs at a batting average of 19.00, with a high score of 46. With the ball he took 3 wickets at a bowling average of 44.66, with best figures of 3/66. He took four catches in the field.

Aria also represented Fiji in 7 non first-class matches in 1948 during their tour of New Zealand. At the time of tour, Aria was working as a corporal in the Fijian police, and weighed 16 stone (224 pounds).

References

External links
Kaminieli Aria at Cricinfo
Kaminieli Aria at CricketArchive

Fijian cricketers
1967 deaths
1921 births
I-Taukei Fijian people